Belmont Heights may refer to:

Belmont Heights, Long Beach, California, a neighborhood
Belmont Heights, Tampa, a neighborhood in East Tampa, Florida